Mänd is a common surname in Estonia (meaning pine), and may refer to:

Ahti Mänd (born 1958), politician
Heljo Mänd (born 1926), children's writer
 (born 1954), zoologist
Tarmo Mänd (born 1950), politician

See also
Männik

Estonian-language surnames